The Sicarii (Modern Hebrew: סיקריים siqariyim) were a splinter group of the Jewish Zealots who, in the decades preceding Jerusalem's destruction in 70 CE, strongly opposed the Roman occupation of Judea and attempted to expel them and their sympathizers from the area. The Sicarii carried sicae, or small daggers, concealed in their cloaks. At public gatherings, they pulled out these daggers to attack Romans and alleged Roman sympathizers alike, blending into the crowd after the deed to escape detection.

The Sicarii are regarded as one of the earliest known organized assassination units of cloak and daggers, predating the Islamic Hashishin and Japanese ninja by centuries. The derived Spanish term sicario is used in contemporary Latin America to describe a hitman.

Etymology
In Latin, Sicarii is the plural form of Sicarius "dagger-man", "dagger-wielder". Sica, possibly from Proto-Albanian *tsikā (whence Albanian thika, "knife"), from Proto-Indo-European *ḱey- ("to sharpen") possibly via Illyrian. In later Latin usage, "sicarius" was also the standard term for a murderer (see, e.g., the Lex Cornelia de Sicariis et Veneficiis), and to this day "sicario" is a salaried assassin in Spanish and a commissioned murderer in Italian and Portuguese.

History

Victims of the Sicarii are thought to have included the High Priest Jonathan, although it is possible that his murder was orchestrated by the Roman governor Antonius Felix. Some murders were met with severe retaliation by the Romans on the entire Jewish population of the region. However, on some occasions, the Sicarii would release their intended victim if their terms were met. Much of what is known about the Sicarii comes from the Antiquities of the Jews and The Jewish War by Josephus, who wrote that the Sicarii agreed to release the kidnapped secretary of Eleazar, governor of the Temple precincts, in exchange for the release of ten captured assassins.

At the beginning of the First Roman-Jewish War, the Sicarii, and (possibly) Zealot helpers (Josephus differentiated between the two but did not explain the main differences in depth), gained access to Jerusalem and committed a series of atrocities in an attempt to incite the population into war against Rome. In one account, given in the Talmud, they destroyed the city's food supply, using starvation to force the people to fight against the Roman siege, instead of negotiating peace. Their leaders, including Menahem ben Yehuda and Eleazar ben Ya'ir, were notable figures in the war, and the group fought in many battles against the Romans as soldiers. Together with a small group of followers, Menahem made his way to the fortress of Masada, took over a Roman garrison and slaughtered all 700 soldiers there. They also took over another fortress called Antonia and overpowered the troops of Agrippa II. He also trained them to conduct various guerrilla operations on Roman convoys and legions stationed around Judea.

Josephus also wrote that the Sicarii raided nearby Hebrew villages including Ein Gedi, where they massacred 700 women and children.

The Zealots, Sicarii and other prominent rebels finally joined forces to attack and temporarily take Jerusalem from Rome in 66 AD, where they took control of the Temple in Jerusalem, executing anyone who tried to oppose their power. The local populace resisted their control and launched a series of sieges and raids to remove the rebel factions. The rebels eventually silenced the uprising and Jerusalem stayed in their hands for the duration of the war. The Romans finally came to take back the city, and they led counter-attacks and sieges to starve the rebels inside. The rebels held for some time, but the constant bickering and the lack of leadership led the groups to disintegrate. The leader of the Sicarii, Menahem, was killed by rival factions during an altercation. Soon, the Romans regained control, and finally destroyed the whole city in 70 AD.

Eleazar and his followers returned to Masada and continued their rebellion against the Romans until 73 AD. The Romans eventually took the fortress and, according to Josephus, found that most of its defenders had committed suicide rather than surrender. In Josephus' The Jewish War (vii), after the fall of the Temple in 70 AD, the sicarii became the dominant revolutionary Hebrew faction, scattered abroad. Josephus particularly associates them with the mass suicide at Masada in 73 AD and to the subsequent refusal "to submit to the taxation census when Cyrenius was sent to Judea to make one" (Josephus) as part of their rebellion's religious and political scheme.

Judas Iscariot, one of the Twelve Apostles of Jesus according to the New Testament, was believed by some to be a sicarius. This opinion is objected to by modern historians, mainly because Josephus in The War of the Hebrews (2:254–7) mentions the appearance of the Sicarii as a new phenomenon during the procuratorships of Felix (52–60 AD), having no apparent relation with the group called Sicarii by Romans at times of Quirinius. Maimonides, in his Mishnah Commentary (Makhshirin 1:6), explains the same word sikrin as meaning "people who harass and who are disposed to being violent."

See also
 Sikrikim, a modern group inspired by the Sicarii
 Knife attack, tactic used by the group
 List of Jewish civil wars

Notes

References

Further reading

 

Masada
Military assassinations
Secret societies
Jews and Judaism in the Roman Empire
First Jewish–Roman War